Williams %R, or just %R, is a technical analysis oscillator showing the current closing price in relation to the high and low of the past  days (for a given ).  It was developed by a publisher and promoter of trading materials, Larry Williams. Its purpose is to tell whether a  stock or commodity market is trading near the high or the low, or somewhere in between, of its recent trading range.

  

The oscillator is on a negative scale, from −100 (lowest) up to 0 (highest), obverse of the more common 0 to 100 scale found in many technical analysis oscillators. A value of −100 means the close today was the lowest low of the past  days, and 0 means today's close was the highest high of the past  days. (Although sometimes the %R is adjusted by adding 100.)

Note

The original formula from his book multiplies the % with 100 instead of −100.  It is possible that another book/magazine printed it incorrectly and this mistake spread out. Many softwares have already implemented it as −100.
  
Book reference:

Buy-/sell-signalling
Williams used a 10 trading day period and considered values below −80 as oversold and above −20 as overbought.  But they were not to be traded directly, instead his rule to buy an oversold was

 %R reaches −100%.
 Five trading days pass since −100% was last reached
 %R rises above −95% or −85%.

or conversely to sell an overbought condition

 %R reaches 0%.
 Five trading days pass since 0% was last reached
 %R drops below −5% or −15%.

The timeframe can be changed for either more sensitive or smoother results. The more sensitive you make it, though, the more false signals you will get.

Notes
Due to the equivalence

 

the %R indicator is arithmetically exactly equivalent to the %K stochastic oscillator, mirrored at the 0%-line, when using the same time interval.

References

Technical indicators

External links 
 Tuned, Using Williams %R Programmatically